Aleksandr Aleksandrovich Maslovsky (born 3 January 1992) is a Russian football player. He plays for FC Yenisey Krasnoyarsk.

Club career
He made his debut in the Russian Football National League for  FC Yenisey Krasnoyarsk on 19 May 2013 in a game against FC Neftekhimik Nizhnekamsk.

References

External links

1992 births
Sportspeople from Krasnoyarsk
Living people
Russian footballers
Association football midfielders
FC Sibir Novosibirsk players
FC Yenisey Krasnoyarsk players
FC Irtysh Omsk players
FC Chita players
FC Orenburg players
Russian First League players
Russian Second League players